This is a list of past and current municipal poets laureate serving towns, counties, and cities in California.

Cities

Albany
Christina Hutchins (2008-2012)
Toby Bielawski (2012-2016)
Rebecca Black (2016 - 2018)

Anaheim
Grant Heir (2018-2020)
Wendy Van Camp (2022-2024)

Benicia
Joel Fallon (2006-2008)  
Robert Shelby (2008-2010) 
Ronna Leon (2010-2012)
Lois Requist (2012-2014)
Don Peery (2014-2016)
Johanna Ely (2016-2018) 
Tom Stanton (2018-2020) 
Mary Susan Gast (2020-2023)

El Cerrito
Maw Shein Win (2016 - 2018) 
  Danielle “Dani” Gabriel (2018 - 2020)
 Eevelyn Mitchell (2021-2023)

Fairfield
Juanita J. Martin (2010-2012)
Bonnie DiMichele (2020-2022)
Suzanne Bruce (2022-2024)

Fresno
James Tyner (2013-2015) 
Lee Herrick (2015-2017) 
S. Bryan Medina (2017-2019) 
Marisol Baca (2019-2021)
Megan Anderson Bohigian (2021-2023)

Livermore
Connie Post (2005-2009)
 Cher Wollard (2009-2013)
 Kevin Gunn (2013-2017)
 Cynthia Patton (2017-2022)
 Peggy Schimmelman (2022–present)

Los Angeles
 Eloise Klein Healy (2012-2014)
 Luis J. Rodriguez (2014-2017)
 Robin Coste Lewis (2017-2019)
 Lynne Thompson (2021-2022)

Richmond
Dwayne Parish (2012-2014)
Lincoln Bergman (2014 - 2016) (concurrent)
Donté Clark (2014-2016) (concurrent)
Brenda Quintanilla (2014 - 2016) (concurrent)
Daniel Ari (2017 - 2019) (concurrent)
Ciera-Jevai Gordon (2017 - 2019) (concurrent)
Rob Lipton (2017 - 2019)  (concurrent)
David Flores (2021-2023)

Sacramento
Dennis Schmitz (2000-2002) (concurrent)
Viola Weinberg (2000-2002) (concurrent)
José Montoya (2002-2004)
Julia Connor (2005-2009)
Bob Stanley (2009-2012)
Jeff Knorr (2012-2015)
Indigo Moor (2017-2019)
Andru Defeye (2020-2022)

San Francisco
Lawrence Ferlinghetti (1998-2000)
Janice Mirikitani (2000-2002)
Devorah Major (2002-2004)
Jack Hirschman (2006-2008)
Diane di Prima (2000-2002)
Alejandro Murguía (2012-2015)
Kim Shuck (2017-2021)
Tongo Eisen-Martin (2021-)

Santa Barbara
Barry Spacks (2005-2007)
Perie Longo (2007-2009)
David Starkey (2009-2011)
Paul Willis (2011-2013)
Chryss Yost (2013-2015)
Sojourner Kincaid Rolle (2015-2017)
Enid Osborn (2017-2019)
Laure-Anne Bosselaar (2019-2021)
Emma Trelles (2021-2023)

Vallejo
Genea Brice (2015-2017)
D.L. Lang (2017-2019)
 Jeremy Snyder (2020-2023)

Counties

Kern County
Don Thompson (2016-2019)
Matthew Woodman (2019–present)

Lake County
Jim Lyle (1998-2002)
James BlueWolf (2002-2004)
Carolyn Wing Greenlee (2004-2006)
Sandra Wade (2006-2008)
Mary McMillan (2008-2010)
Russell Gonzaga (2010-2012)
Elaine Watt (2012-2014)
Casey Carney (2014-2016)
Julie Adams (2016-2018)
Richard Schmidt (2018-2020)
Georgina Marie Guardado (2020-2023)

Marin County
 Albert Flynn DeSilver (2008-2010)
 Lyn Follett (2010-2013)
 Joe Zaccardi (2013-2015)
 Prartho Sereno (2015-2017)
 Rebecca Foust (2017-2019)
 Terry Lucas (2019-2021)

Napa County
Beclee Wilson (2015-2017)
Jeremy Benson (2017-2021)
Marianne Lyon (2021-2022)

Nevada County
Molly Fisk

Santa Clara County

- Nils Peterson (2009-2011)

- Sally Ashton (2011-2013)

- David Perez (2014-2015)

- Arlene Biala (2016-2017)

- Mike McGee(2018-2019)

- Janice Sapigao (2020-2021)

- Tshaka Campbell (2022-2023)

San Mateo County
 Caroline Goodwin (2014 – 2016)
 Lisa Rosenberg (2017 – 2018)
Aileen Cassinetto (2019 – 2022)

Notes
1.Eevelyn Mitchell's term as poet laureate was extended to a third year in August of 2022.

References

See also

 Poets laureate of U.S. states
 California Poet Laureate
 United States Poet Laureate

California
Poets from California
Lists of poets